The 1937 Penn State Nittany Lions men's soccer team represented Pennsylvania State University during the 1937 season playing in the Intercollegiate Soccer League. It was the program's 27th season fielding a men's varsity soccer team. The 1937 season is William Jeffrey's 12 year at the helm.

Background 

The 1937 season was the Nittany Lions' 27th season as a varsity soccer program, and their 12th season playing as a part of the Intercollegiate Soccer Football Association. The team was led by 12th year head coach, William Jeffrey, who had previously served as the head coach for the semi-professional soccer team, Altoona Works.

The Nittany Lions finished out the 1937 season sharing the Eastern Intercollegiate Soccer Association title with Springfield College. Concluding 1937 campaign with a record of 8–0–1, Penn State notched its 5th consecutive undefeated season.

Squad

Departures

Roster

Schedule 

|-
!colspan=8 style=""| Regular season
|-

Honors and awards

References

External links 

1937
Penn State Nittany Lions
Penn State Nittany Lions men's soccer